James (Jimmy) Lindley is a former goalkeeper.

He signed his first professional contract at Notts County. He has also played for Tamworth, Lincoln City, Hucknall Town, Harrogate Town and Mansfield Town. He re-joined Ilkeston Town on a permanent basis in December 2007 after falling out of favour at Alfreton Town. However, he soon left Ilkeston Town and initially retired from football after struggling to keep an interest in the game. In May 2008 he signed for Hucknall for a third time. At the start of the 2009/2010 season, Lindley had joined Retford United At the start of the 2012/2013 season, he was signed by Grantham Town in the Premier Division of the Northern Premier League.
After spells at Loughborough and Handsworth Parramore he retired from the game in March 2015.

References

External links

James Lindley career stats at GresleyRovers.com
Unofficial James Lindley Profile at The Forgotten Imp

1981 births
Living people
Sportspeople from Sutton-in-Ashfield
Footballers from Nottinghamshire
English footballers
Association football goalkeepers
Notts County F.C. players
Gresley F.C. players
Tamworth F.C. players
Hucknall Town F.C. players
Harrogate Town A.F.C. players
Alfreton Town F.C. players
Mansfield Town F.C. players
Lincoln City F.C. players
Stafford Rangers F.C. players
Ilkeston Town F.C. (1945) players
Retford United F.C. players
Glapwell F.C. players
English Football League players
Northern Premier League players
Grantham Town F.C. players